The Great Divide is the Bluegrass debut solo album by Styx guitarist/vocalist Tommy Shaw, released on March 22, 2011.

Track listing
"The Next Right Thing" (Shaw) – 3:05
"Back In Your Kitchen" (Shaw, Gary Burr) – 3:02
"Sawmill" (Shaw) – 2:27
"The Great Divide" (Shaw, Paula Breedlove) – 3:16
"Shadows in the Moonlight" (Shaw, Gary Burr) – 3:10
"Get On The One" (Shaw) – 2:09
"Umpteen Miles" (Shaw, Brad Davis) – 3:17
"Cavalry" (Shaw, Gary Burr) – 2:34
"Afraid To Love" (Shaw, Brad Davis) – 2:59
"Give 'em Hell Harry" (Shaw) – 4:36
"I'll Be Coming Home" (Shaw, Brad Davis) – 2:56

Personnel
Tommy Shaw – Lead vocals (all tracks), Resonator Guitar (tracks 1, 5, 9, 11), Dobro (tracks 2, 3), mandolin, and guitar (tracks 4, 6-8, 10)
Dwight Yoakam – Backing vocals (track 1)
Brad Davis – guitar (All tracks except 10)
Chris Brown – drums (tracks 1-3, 5, 6, 8)
Sam Bush – mandolin (All tracks except 10)
Byron House – bass (All tracks except 10)
Rob Ickes – Dobro (tracks 1, 5, 6, 8)
Scott Vestal – Banjo (tracks 1, 2, 6)
Stuart Duncan – Fiddle (tracks 1, 3, 5, 7-11)
Will Evankovich – Backing Vocals (tracks 2 and 7), guitar (tracks 4 and 11)
Greg Davis – Banjo (track 3)
Alison Krauss – Backing vocals (tracks 4 and 9)
Jerry Douglas – Dobro (tracks 4 and 9)

Production
Producers: Tommy Shaw, Brad Davis, Will Evankovich
Engineers: Matt Andrews (Sound Emporium) and Will Evankovich (The Shop)
Mixing: Alan Hertz and Will Evankovich

Chart performance

References

External links
Official Site

2011 albums
Tommy Shaw albums